The 2003 Major League Baseball All-Star Game was the 74th midsummer classic between the all-stars of the American League (AL) and National League (NL), the two leagues constituting Major League Baseball, and celebrated the 70th anniversary of the inaugural All-Star Game played in Chicago, Illinois in 1933.

The game was held on July 15, 2003 at U.S. Cellular Field, the home of the Chicago White Sox of the American League. The game resulted in the American League defeating the National League 7–6, thus awarding an AL team (which was eventually the New York Yankees) home-field advantage in the 2003 World Series. This game was the first All-Star Game to award home-field advantage in the World Series to the winning league, a rule that stemmed from a controversial 7–7 tie in the previous year's edition. In the days leading up to the game, Fox advertised it with the tagline: "This time it counts." Subsequent editions altered the slogan to "This one counts" to reflect the new method of determining the World Series' home-field advantage; that arrangement ended with the 2016 edition, where the AL team (which became the Cleveland Indians, now the  Cleveland Guardians) also won home-field advantage; the AL would win the next six years, as well as the last four. The winning league had a 9–5 record in the corresponding year's World Series, with the AL going 6–5 in the 11 years it won the All Star Game and the NL going 3–0 in the three years it won the All Star Game.

This All-Star Game marked the seventh All-Star appearance for the Naval Station Great Lakes color guard from Waukegan, Illinois, who this year was joined by police officers from the Kane County Sheriff's Department who presented the Canadian and American flags in the outfield.  Both the five-man color guard and the sheriff's department officers accompanied Michael Bublé, who sang O Canada, and Vanessa Carlton, who sang The Star-Spangled Banner.  Bublé's performance of "O Canada" was not televised until after the game in the Chicago area, while Carlton's performance was followed by fireworks that shot off the U.S. Cellular Field scoreboard. This was also the last All-Star game to have the stadium's public address announcer announce the all-star rosters and coaches; the game's play-by-play announcer (in this case, Joe Buck) proceeds that custom starting the next year's game and onwards.

Rosters
Players in italics have since been inducted into the National Baseball Hall of Fame.

National League

American League

Notes
  Player was unable to play due to injury.
  Player was selected to start, but was unable to play due to injury.
  Player replaced an injured player.
  Player was selected by the fans through the All-Star Final Vote.

Game

Coaching staffs

Umpires

Starting lineups

Game summary

Starters Esteban Loaiza and Jason Schmidt were sharp early on, each throwing a scoreless couple of innings to start the game.  In the third, Roger Clemens relieved Loaiza and threw a scoreless inning himself. Randy Wolf could not do the same, allowing Carlos Delgado to single home Ichiro Suzuki with the game's first run, and a 1–0 lead for the AL.

The lead would stand until the fifth inning, when Todd Helton gave the NL the lead with a two-run homer off Shigetoshi Hasegawa. The National League would go on to score three more runs that inning, on the strength of a two-run double from Andruw Jones and an RBI single from Albert Pujols, giving the NL a 5–1 lead.

In the sixth, Garret Anderson hit a two-run homer off Woody Williams to bring the AL back within two.  Andruw Jones would get one of those runs back the next inning by hitting a solo shot off Mark Mulder. Jason Giambi got the run right back with a solo shot off Billy Wagner in the seventh.

In the eighth came Éric Gagné, who did not blow any saves in the 2003 regular season.  The All-Star Game would prove to be the one blemish on his record for the year.  Staked to a 6–4 lead, Gagne gave up a one-out double to Garret Anderson, who was replaced by pinch-runner Melvin Mora. Vernon Wells singled Mora home to make it a one-run game. Then Hank Blalock hit a dramatic, two-out go-ahead home run to put the AL up 7–6.

Keith Foulke came in the ninth to try to earn the save. Foulke closed the door and set the side down 1-2-3. Garret Anderson, who batted 3–4 with a double, home run and two RBI, was awarded the game's MVP honors, a night after winning the 2003 Home Run Derby.

Home Run Derby

Notes
For the first time since 1978 (Reds: Pete Rose, Joe Morgan, and George Foster) an all-star team had the first three hitters from the same regular season team (Cardinals: Renteria, Edmonds, and Pujols).
From 1997-July 1998, Jason Schmidt and Esteban Loaiza were teammates in Pittsburgh.
The honorary captains for the game were Hall of Famers Gary Carter (N.L.) and Luis Aparicio (A.L.).
This was Eric Gagné's only blown save of 2003, as he went a perfect 55 for 55 in save opportunities in the regular season.
This was the first All-Star Game in which one of the managers was not the manager of the team he had taken to the World Series the year before.  NL manager Dusty Baker had led the San Francisco Giants to the NL pennant in 2002, but during the offseason had left the Giants to become manager of the Chicago Cubs.  Baker, and not his San Francisco replacement, Felipe Alou, still managed the team.

External links
All-Star Game Home Page
Home Run Derby
Boxscore
Game Recap

Major League Baseball All-Star Game
Major League Baseball All-Star Game
Baseball in Chicago
2000s in Chicago
2003 in Illinois
Sports competitions in Chicago
July 2003 sports events in the United States
2003 in sports in Illinois